The 1910 Princeton Tigers football team represented Princeton University in the 1910 college football season. The team finished with a 7–1 record under fourth-year head coach Bill Roper.  The Tigers won their first seven games by a combined score of 98 to 0, but lost the final game of the season to rival Yale by a 5–3 score. Princeton halfback Talbot Pendleton was selected as a consensus first-team honoree on the 1910 College Football All-America Team, and one other player, a guard named Thomas A. Wilson, was selected as a first-team honoree by at least one selector.

Schedule

References

Princeton
Princeton Tigers football seasons
Princeton Tigers football